Shun Kubo (born April 8, 1990) is a Japanese professional boxer who held the WBA (Regular) super-bantamweight title in 2017.

Professional career

Kubo won his first twelve bouts and the WBA (Regular) super-bantamweight title on April 8th, 2017, by defeating Nehomar Cermeño, who retired after the tenth round despite knocking Kubo down in the seventh. Kubo lost the title to Daniel Roman in his first defense.

Professional boxing record

External links
 

1990 births
Living people
Super-bantamweight boxers
World super-bantamweight boxing champions
World Boxing Association champions
Japanese male boxers